Neverland, full title Neverland: Never Grow Up, Never Grow Old, is a 2003 indie film by director Damion Dietz with New Media Entertainment and is a dark and surreal modern re-imagining of the classic of Peter Pan and other characters in J. M. Barrie's 1904 play Peter Pan; or, the Boy Who Wouldn't Grow Up and 1911 novel Peter and Wendy.

Synopsis
The award-winning film, loosely based on Barrie's work, presents the characters with a twist. It features Peter Pan as an older, androgynous teen, whereas the fairy Tinker Bell is a drugged and burnt out girl, the Lost Boys are hot guys and pot heads, the Darling children are adopted, Wendy Darling is black, Captain Hook is a gay leather man and Tiger Lily is a transvestite. The events take place in Neverland which is an amusement park in the film, rather than the imaginary island.

Cast
Rick Sparks as Peter Pan
Deborah Quayle as Mrs. Darling
David Jahn as Mr. Darling
Marcus Reynaga as Michael Darling
Wil Wheaton as John Darling
Melany Bell as Wendy Darling
Joey as Nana
Stephanie Kirchen as Liza (credited as Stephanie Orff)
Kari Wahlgren as Tink
Ryan Patrick Kelly as Tootles
Ian Mantha as Slightly
Eli Swanson as Curly
Zac Cole as Nibs
Tyler Kremer as Twin #1
Nathan Towry as Twin #2
Jake Winsryg as Tink's Kid
Gary Kelley as Hook
Scott Mechlowicz as Smee
Kevin Christy as Crocodile
Reed Prescott as Boyfriend
Ray Garcia as Tiger Lily
Monica Louwerens, Yayoi Ito, Karen Blake Challman, Roman Vasquez, Red Savage and Al Bee, as Indians
Saadia Billman, Elena Fabri and Jill Kocalis as Mermaids
Karim Imam as Cecco
Gilbert Aguilera as Starkey
Richard John Walters as Bill Jukes
Steven Reiswig as Cookson
Craig Jackman as Park Announcer

Awards
2003: Won Q Award at Fort Worth Gay and Lesbian International Film Festival
2003: Director Damion Dietz won Honorable Mention at the Dances With Films festival

External links
 

2003 films
Films directed by Damion Dietz
Peter Pan films
Films shot at Pinewood Studios
Cross-dressing in film
British LGBT-related films
2000s English-language films
2000s British films